Lathyrus rotundifolius, the Persian everlasting pea, is a species of flowering plant in the pea family Fabaceae, native to Turkey. Unlike its relative, the sweet pea (Lathyrus odoratus), the flowers are unscented.

It holds the Royal Horticultural Society's Award of Garden Merit. It is a suitable subject for scrambling over a fence or through another shrub or tree.

References

rotundifolius
Flora of the Crimean Peninsula
Flora of East European Russia
Flora of West Siberia